Forbes Park may refer to:

 Forbes Park, Makati, Philippines
 Forbes Park, Chelsea, Massachusetts, United States